The pale-footed bush warbler (Hemitesia pallidipes) is a species of oriental warbler in the family Cettiidae that is found in southern Asia. It occurs in the Himalayan region west from Dehradun through the foothills of Nepal to northeastern India. It also occurs in Myanmar, Laos, northern Vietnam and southern China. A single sighting was recorded from Kandy, Sri Lanka in March 1993.

Taxonomy
The pale-footed bush warbler was formally described in 1872 by the English naturalist William Blandford under the binomial name Phylloscopus pallidipes. The specific epithet pallidipes combines the Latin pallidus meaning "pale" with pes meaning "foot". This warbler in now placed in the genus Hemitesia that was introduced by James Chapin in 1948.

Three subspecies are recognised:
 H. p. pallidipes (Blanford, 1872)	– Himalayas to west Yunnan (south China) and north Myanmar
 H. p. laurentei La Touche, 1921 – central Myanmar and south east Yunnan (south China) to Vietnam
 H. p. osmastoni (Hartert, E, 1908) – Andaman Islands

Distribution and habitat
The pale-footed bush warbler usually associates with Themeda grasslands. The habitat and altitudinal limit for pale-footed bush warbler vary slightly from place to place.

Nepal
The pale-footed bush warbler is a resident bird for Nepal. It is mostly found in Chitwan.  This species is threatened by habitat loss and population decline in Nepal.

India
In peninsular India the pale-footed bush warbler U. p. pallidipes has been reported as breeding in the Eastern Ghats by Salim Ali and Sidney Dillon Ripley. They collected a specimen from Sunkarametta, Araku Valley, Vishakapatnam district [altitude of ] in the month of April. A male adult of the subspecies U. p. osmastoni was first described from Andaman Islands [altitude ] by Ernst Hartert. Nest-building in U. p. osmastoni was described by Bertram Beresford Osmaston in the year 1907. Subspecies U. p. pallidipes has also been reported from Simlipal Tiger Reserve, Simlipal National Park Odisha [altitude ] in December 2012 from a grassland near a Sal forest

Behaviour
The pale-footed bush warbler is extremely shy and is a great skulker, meaning it is very difficult to see even during the breeding season. This species breeds from May to July. The bird is usually found either by itself or in pairs in low bushes and grass clumps. It is also known as a ground-dwelling species; thus, it flies less than a meter above ground. It moves through grass reeds keeping low, staying mostly out of sight and it feeds on the lower half of grass reeds.

Vocalization
The pale-footed bush warbler has a loud song. Because it remains near the ground, it is more easily heard than seen. This species remains mostly silent during winter but its call and song can be easily heard during spring. Its explosive song is the best way to signal the presence of its species.

References

 

pale-footed bush warbler
Birds of North India
Birds of Nepal
Birds of Eastern Himalaya
Birds of Yunnan
Birds of Myanmar
Birds of Laos
Birds of Vietnam
Birds of the Andaman Islands
pale-footed bush warbler
Taxobox binomials not recognized by IUCN